How We Live: At the Philharmonic is the title of Ian McNabb's second live album. The album was culled from two June 2007 shows at Liverpool's Philharmonic Hall.

Track listing
 "They Settled For Less Than They Wanted"	 [4:24]
 "The Absentee	 [5:31]
 Believer of Me"	 [3:57]
 "Picture of the Moon"	 [2:38]
 "Hope Street Rag"	 [3:36]
 "The Lonely Ones"	 [4:03]
 "Steel and Glass"	 [4:19]
 "A Secret Everybody Knows"	 [3:29]
 "Little Princess"	 [6:24]
 "Hurricane Elaine"	 [4:22]
 "You Stone My Soul"	 [8:26]
 "May You Always"	 [4:22]

References

Ian McNabb albums